Koiari Rural LLG is a local-level government (LLG) of Central Province, Papua New Guinea.

Wards
01. Osabewai
03.Mesime
06. Vaiagai
07. Furimuti
. Depo (Mageri)
06. Vesilogo
07. Bereadabu
08. Kailaki
09. Doe
10. Ogotana
11. Kahitana
12. Berebei
13. Varutanumu
14. Suria/Kotoi
15. Boridi
16. Kagi
17. Efogi
18. Manari
19. Edevu
20. Sogeri Urban
83. Sogeri Urban
86. Goldie Urban 01

References

Local-level governments of Central Province (Papua New Guinea)